Action Girl may refer to:

Dollikins, the UK name for the toy doll line
Action Girl Comics, a feminist comic book edited by Sarah Dyer
 A counterpart to Action Man made by Mattel in the 60's